Alexander Kidd was a British tug of war competitor who competed in the 1908 Summer Olympics. In 1908 he won the silver medal as member of the British team Liverpool Police.

References

External links
Alexander Kidd's profile at databaseOlympics
Alexander Kidd's profile at Sports Reference.com

Year of birth missing
Year of death missing
Liverpool City Police officers
Olympic tug of war competitors of Great Britain
Tug of war competitors at the 1908 Summer Olympics
Olympic silver medallists for Great Britain
Olympic medalists in tug of war
Medalists at the 1908 Summer Olympics